Viktor Mykolayovych Kryvenko (born 9 January 1982) is a Ukrainian politician.

Biography
In 2009–10, he was the deputy director general at the State Space Agency of Ukraine. In 2014, Kryvenko became the head of the Technopolis and Industrial Parks National Projects. Appearing fifth on the party list of Self Reliance, he was elected to the Verkhovna Rada in the 2014 Ukrainian parliamentary election. Kryvenko was expelled from Self Reliance on 31 August 2015 for his support of amendments to the Ukrainian Constitution that would lead to decentralization.

On 31 March 2016, he joined the Petro Poroshenko Bloc parliamentary faction. Kryvenko also joined (the political party) People's Movement of Ukraine in April 2016. On 21 December 2017 Kryvenko left the Petro Poroshenko Bloc parliamentary faction.

On 10 January 2019 Kryvenko was chosen the People's Movement of Ukraine candidate in the 2019 Ukrainian presidential election and their chairman. In the election he received 0.04% of the vote.

In the 2019 Ukrainian parliamentary election Kryvenko failed to win a seat as People's Movement of Ukraine candidate in constituency 151 situated in Poltava Oblast.

References

External link

1982 births
Living people
People from Kamianske
Eighth convocation members of the Verkhovna Rada
Self Reliance (political party) politicians
People's Movement of Ukraine politicians
Oles Honchar Dnipro National University alumni
Candidates in the 2019 Ukrainian presidential election